Hassan Saada (born 2 January 1994) is a Moroccan boxer. He was initially scheduled to compete in the men's light heavyweight competition at the 2016 Summer Olympics, but Saada was ejected from the competition after being arrested for sexual assault the day before the opening ceremony. Saada was arrested and jailed during the Olympics in Rio de Janeiro after allegations of sexual assault and attempted rape were made against him by two Brazilian women who worked in the Olympic Village in Barra da Tijuca as waitresses, one day before he was due to fight at the Olympic Games.  Saada was stripped of his Olympic competitor status, and was arrested in Brazil for 10 months until an habeas corpus was granted by the Brazilian Supreme Court.

References

External links 
 
 
 
 
 

1994 births
Living people
Moroccan male boxers
Olympic boxers of Morocco
Boxers at the 2016 Summer Olympics
Light-heavyweight boxers
Sportspeople from Casablanca
21st-century Moroccan people
20th-century Moroccan people